Jane Webb Karyl, (August 13, 1925 – March 30, 2010) best known as Jane Webb, was an American film, radio, and voice actress, best known for her work on Filmation's cartoons.

Early years
Webb's mother was Estelle Sigrid Webb, a Swedish immigrant who was an operatic soprano and performed at the Metropolitan Opera. She is a descendant of James Webb, who used to accompany George Washington on his surveying trips.

As a high school student in Central YMCA High School, she was president of the student council and headed other student organizations. On June 10, 1942, Edwards graduated "with honor".

Career

In 1933/34, she started her career as a professional entertainer when she was mistress of ceremonies, singing a Swedish song in a Chicago Century of Progress show.

Throughout the 1930s and 1940s, Edwards acted on multiple radio series, including the Tom Mix Ralston Straight Shooters.

On April 19, 1939, Webb signed an acting contract with Paramount Pictures.

During her later career, she worked on a large number of animated cartoons, mostly for Filmation.

In 1974, Webb appeared in Jim Backus's comedy album The Dirty Old Man, providing voices of two characters.

Personal life
In 1947, Webb moved from Chicago, Illinois to the neighborhood of Hollywood Hills, California, along with her family. In Spring 1948, Webb married Jack Lawson Edwards, Jr, brother of actor and cartoon voiceover performer Sam Edwards. The couple moved to New York City to continue their careers in television until they moved back to Hollywood Hills. The couple had two sons, Alan Edwards, a U.S. Navy member, and Steven Monroe, a lead guitarist and vocalist. In 1960, the couple moved to the neighborhood of Studio City.

Jack Edwards Jr. died in September 2008. Webb resided in Green Valley, Arizona during her later life.

Death
On March 30, 2010, Webb died in Green Valley, Arizona. The cause of death is unknown.

Filmography

References

External links
 

1925 births
2010 deaths
American radio actresses
American film actresses
American television actresses
Filmation people
Actresses from Chicago
People from Green Valley, Arizona